Guatemala competed at the 2012 Summer Olympics in London from 27 July to 12 August 2012. This was the nation's thirteenth appearance at the Summer Olympics, having missed three Olympics after its debut at the 1952 Summer Olympics in Helsinki.

Comité Olímpico Guatemalteco, sent the nation's largest delegation to the Games after the 1996 Summer Olympics in Atlanta. A total of 19 athletes, 12 men and 7 women, competed in 11 sports and 21 distinct events. Four Guatemalan athletes made their second consecutive Olympic appearance, including badminton player Kevin Cordón, and Laser sailor Juan Ignacio Maegli, who was the nation's flag bearer at the opening ceremony. Pistol shooter Sergio Sánchez, who had participated in the Olympic games since 1992, was the oldest member of the contingent, at age 41.

Guatemala left London with its first ever Olympic medal won by Erick Barrondo, who won silver in the men's race walk event.

Medalists

Athletics

Guatemalan athletes have so far achieved qualifying standards in the following athletics events (up to a maximum of 3 athletes in each event at the 'A' Standard, and 1 at the 'B' Standard):

Men

Women

Badminton

Cycling

Road

Gymnastics

Artistic
Women

Judo

Modern pentathlon

Andrei Gheorghe has qualified through the 2011 Pan American Games

Sailing

Guatemala has qualified 1 boat for each of the following events

Men

Women

M = Medal race; EL = Eliminated – did not advance into the medal race;

Shooting 

Guatemala has so far qualified two shooters.

Men

Swimming

Men

Taekwondo

Guatemala has qualified 1 woman.

Weightlifting

Guatemala has qualified 1 man and 1 woman.

See also
Guatemala at the 2011 Pan American Games

References

Summer Olympics
Nations at the 2012 Summer Olympics
2012